Welch Suggs is a sportswriter chiefly covering American collegiate sports. He is an associate director for the Knight Commission on Intercollegiate Athletics and an associate professor of journalism at the University of Georgia. He is a writer for The Chronicle of Higher Education. In 2005, Suggs released A Place on the Team: The Triumph and Tragedy of Title IX through Princeton University Press about Title IX, concerning sex discrimination in education.

References

American sportswriters
University of Georgia people
Living people
Year of birth missing (living people)